Haverholme is a hamlet and site of Haverholme Priory in the North Kesteven district of Lincolnshire, England.

Haverholme was a civil parish between 1858 and 1931.

Haverholme Priory a Gilbertine priory of Saint Mary founded in 1139 and dissolved in 1539, was located here. The site is now scheduled. 

A red-brick and limestone mansion house, also called Haverholme Priory, and dating from 1780 was built on the same site. It was later rebuilt by H. E. Kendall in 1835, which was the seat of the Finch-Hatton family. The house fell into disrepair in the early 20th century and today only a fragment remains, which is Grade II listed.

References

External links

Hamlets in Lincolnshire
North Kesteven District